Carrickfergus FM is a Restricted Service Licence community radio station which broadcasts bi-annually in the town of Carrickfergus, Northern Ireland during the Christmas and Summer periods. The station was launched in June 2005, and was set up by a committee of local traders and two commercial radio presenters who had many years experience in running and operating RSL's.

The community station is primarily for the residents of the Borough of Carrickfergus but also broadcasts to a large online audience and combines a mix of professional radio presenters with new talent from the local area. It currently is the longest running short-term radio station in Northern Ireland.

In 2006, Carrickfergus FM received a Certificate at the Carrickfergus Business Awards in the "Best Community Initiative" category and is an active part of the community, providing entertainment at numerous functions, including the "Special Olympics party" at the Castle Green, the Christmas Tree Light Switch On and the Girl Guides Centenary Festival in years gone by as well as throwing an on-air promotion party for Carrick Rangers after they won the Championship in the 2010/2011 season. The team provided exclusive radio coverage of Armed Forces Day 2012 in the town and have professionally recorded and produced a DVD which will go on sale to raise funds for local armed forces charities.

Carrickfergus FM's reputation within the borough is such that it has attracted several celebrity interviews, recently including the likes of former Eurovision winner Niamh Kavanagh , ex-Premier League footballer Michael Hughes , X Factor's Eoghan Quigg  and highly acclaimed broadcasters George Jones, Hendi & John Rosborough amongst others.

In recent years the station has become renowned for fun features, perhaps none more so than the annual Bagger of the Year competition which has attracted attention from major multi-national retailers and local corner shops alike.

Presenters 

Current Presenters and Team 
 Michael Clarke
 Donagh McKeown
 Justin Macartney
 Maurice Taggart
 Sam McFerran
 Patrick Smyth
 Sean Brown
 David Gabbie
 Andrew Hammill
 David McGuinness aka Mojo
 Caitlyn McCaigue
 Ed Canning
 
 Aaron Anderson (ando)
 Stewart Harper

Past presenters
 Kenny Tosh
 Phil West
 Bill Smyth
 Colin Kennedy (CK the DJ)
 Mal Reynolds
 Alan Jenkins
 Lorraine Lee
 Sarah-Jayne Cassells
 Andrew Frazier
 Lauren Mulvenny
 Mark Horner
 Aaron Anderson (ando)

References

Carrickfergus
Radio stations established in 2005
Radio stations in Northern Ireland
2005 establishments in Northern Ireland